Buitenpost is a railway station located in Buitenpost, Netherlands. The station was opened on 1 June 1866 and is located on the Harlingen–Nieuweschans railway between Leeuwarden and Groningen. The station is currently operated by Arriva.

Train services
The station is served by the following service(s):
1x per hour express service (sneltrein) Leeuwarden - Groningen
2x per hour local service (stoptrein) Leeuwarden - Groningen

Bus services

12: Buitenpost - Augustinusga - Surhuizum - Surhuisterveen - Drachten
62: Buitenpost - Kollum - Kollumerzwaag - De Westereen - Feanwâlden - Hurdegaryp - Leeuwarden
63: Buitenpost - Kollum - Dokkum
101: Buitenpost - Gerkesklooster - Lutjegast - Grootegast
101: Buitenpost - Twijzel - Kootstermolen
261: Buitenpost - Veenklooster - Damwâld (DRT)

The lines 11 and 101 are operated by Qbuzz, the other lines by Arriva.

See also
 List of railway stations in Friesland

External links
Arriva website 
Dutch Public Transport journey planner 

Railway stations in Friesland
Railway stations opened in 1866
Railway stations on the Staatslijn B
1866 establishments in the Netherlands
Railway stations in the Netherlands opened in the 19th century